New York State Route 351 (NY 351) is a north–south state highway in central Rensselaer County, New York, in the United States. The portion of NY 351 north of the hamlet of Poestenkill was originally designated as New York State Route 153 in the 1930s. This designation was removed in the 1940s, and the West Sand Lake–Cropseyville roadway became County Route 77 (CR 77) sometime afterward. On April 1, 1980, all of CR 77 was transferred to the state of New York, at which time it was redesignated as NY 351 by the New York State Department of Transportation (NYSDOT).

Route description

It initially heads northeastward through the town of Sand Lake as a two-lane highway named Reichard Lake Road, passing through a residential yet wooded area in the vicinity of Racquet Lake. The woods eventually overtake the homes as the route heads away from the lake and into the town of Poestenkill; however, NY 351 quickly enters another residential area based around the route's junction with NY 66. Just west of the intersection is Algonquin Middle School, part of the Averill Park Central School District. Past NY 66, NY 351 changes names to Round Top Road and heads into an isolated part of Poestenkill, passing through a mixture of forests and sparsely developed open areas as it meanders northward.

After  of little to no development, NY 351 enters the hamlet of Poestenkill, the northernmost community of significance along the route. In the center of the community, it intersects NY 355 at an all-way stop intersection. The junction was originally the eastern terminus of NY 154; however, that route was eliminated as part of a highway maintenance swap in 1980 that ultimately created NY 351. The route continues north from Poestenkill as White Church Road, winding its way through the open and hilly terrain of the northern part of the town. The terrain's complexion remains the same in the adjacent town of Brunswick, where the highway changes names to Farm to Market Road. In Brunswick, NY 351 serves only a handful of homes before it terminates at a junction with NY 2 in the hamlet of Cropseyville. The Brunswick Central School District's Tamarac Secondary School is a short distance to the west on NY 2.

History
The segment of modern NY 351 north of the hamlet of Poestenkill was originally designated as NY 153 . This designation was removed in the early 1940s. All of former NY 153 was later incorporated into CR 77, a county route maintained by Rensselaer County that extended from the hamlet of West Sand Lake to the hamlet of Cropseyville via Postenkill. On April 1, 1980, ownership and maintenance of all of CR 77 was transferred from Rensselaer County to the state of New York as part of a county-wide highway maintenance swap. The route, now maintained by NYSDOT, was redesignated as NY 351.

Major intersections

See also

References

External links

351
Transportation in Rensselaer County, New York